The 1935 All-SEC football team consists of American football players selected to the All-Southeastern Conference (SEC) chosen by various selectors for the 1935 college football season. The LSU Tigers won the conference, posting an undefeated conference record.

All-SEC selections

Ends
Willie Geny, Vanderbilt (AP-1, AU-1)
Gaynell Tinsley, LSU (College Football Hall of Fame) (AP-1, AU-1)
Gene Rose, Tennessee (AP-2, AU-1)
Chuck Gelatka, Miss. St. (AP-2, AU-1)
Bear Bryant, Alabama (College Football Hall of Fame) (AP-3)
Warren Barrett, LSU (AP-3)

Tackles
James Whatley, Alabama (AP-1, AU-1)
Haygood Paterson, Auburn (AP-1, AU-1)
Justin Rukas, LSU (AP-2, AU-2)
Sterling Richardson, Ole Miss (AP-2)
Lefty Eubanks, Georgia Tech (AU-2)
Stanley Nevers, Kentucky (AP-3)
Ranny Throgmorton, Vanderbilt (AP-3)

Guards
Frank Johnson, Georgia (AP-1)
Middleton Fitzsimmons, Georgia Tech (AP-1)
Frank Gantt, Auburn (AP-2, AU-1)
Osborn Helveston, LSU (AU-1)
Tarzan White, Alabama (AP-3, AU-2)
Samuel Brown, Vanderbilt (AP-2)
Leroy Moorehead, Georgia (AU-2)
William Stone, Miss. St. (AP-3)

Centers
Walter Gilbert, Auburn (College Football Hall of Fame) (AP-1, AU-1)
Kavanaugh Francis, Alabama (AP-2, AU-2)
Marvin Stewart, LSU (AP-3)

Quarterbacks
Riley Smith, Alabama (College Football Hall of Fame) (AP-1, AU-1)
Rand Dixon, Vanderbilt (AP-2, AU-2)
Barney Mintz, Tulane (AP-3)

Halfbacks
Ike Pickle, Miss. St. (AP-1, AU-1)
Jesse Fatherree, LSU (AP-1, AU-1)
Ray Hapes, Ole Miss (AP-3, AU-1 [as fb])
Robert Davis, Kentucky (AP-2, AU-2)
Rad Rodgers, Ole Miss (AP-2)
John Bond, Georgia (AU-2)
Billy Chase, Florida (AP-3)

Fullbacks
Bill Crass, LSU (AP-1, AU-2)
Abe Mickal, LSU (College Football Hall of Fame) (AP-2)
Dutch Konemann, Georgia Tech (AP-3)

Key

AP = compiled by the Associated Press from coaches and sportswriters.

AU = selected by The Plainsmen, Auburn's semi weekly paper.

See also
1935 College Football All-America Team

References

All-SEC
All-SEC football teams